Khadija Monifa "Bunny" Shaw OD (born 31 January 1997) is a Jamaican professional footballer who plays as a forward for FA Women's Super League club Manchester City and the Jamaica women's national team. She is Jamaica's all-time top goalscorer.

Early life
Shaw was born in Spanish Town, Jamaica to George Shaw, a shoemaker, and mother Monica, a chicken farmer. She was the youngest of 13 brothers and sisters. Shaw was nicknamed 'Bunny' by her brother Kentardo because of a fondness for carrots at an early age. She attended high school at St Jago High School. 

Shaw begun playing football with her older brothers before being taught by her brother Kentardo at age 10. At age 13, Shaw was called up for the Jamaica U15s team for the first time. While representing Jamaica, she begun received scholarships offer from Navarro College in Texas and Eastern Florida State College. She was then scouted by the University of Tennessee. She graduated from the University of Tennessee with a degree in communication.

College career
Shaw played her first two years of junior college at Eastern Florida State College, earning NSCAA first-team National Junior College Athletic Association All-America honors in 2016.

In 2017, Shaw transferred to the University of Tennessee. During her time with the Tennessee Volunteers, she was converted from a midfielder to a striker by her coach Brian Pensky. She was named to the All-SEC first team in both her seasons with Tennessee and was awarded SEC Offensive Player of the Year as a senior in 2018. She decided against entering into the NWSL Draft after college in order to look at overseas options in Europe and Asia.

Club career

Florida Krush 
In 2018, Shaw played for WPSL semi-pro team Florida Krush.

Bordeaux 
On 7 June 2019, D1 Féminine team Bordeaux announced they had signed Shaw on a two-year contract.

Khadija made her professional debut on 25 August 2019 with Bordeaux against FC Fleury 91. On her debut game, she scored a brace that led to a 4–1 victory for the home team. She repeated her performance, at an away game this time against Dijon FCO, on her second game. In her first season, she scored 10 goals and made five assists in 15 league matches. Shaw scored four goals in a 6–1 victory over FC Fleury 91 on 10 October 2020. She went on and scored hat-tricks against Dijon FCO and Stade de Reims during the season, with the former happening on 31 October 2020 to help earn them a 5–1 home victory and the later on 23 January 2021 to help Bordeaux to a massive 7–1 victory. Her goal scoring run and general performance earned her the Division 1 Féminine Player of the Month twice in the months of October 2020 and January 2021. She ended her second league season with 22 goals and seven assists in 20 matches winning the as the top goal scorer, beating Marie-Antoinette Katoto by a goal and also earning a place on the Trophées FFF D1 Féminine 2020–2021 Team of the Year. She was nominated for the best player of the season awards for both Trophées UNFP du football and Trophées FFF D1 Féminine, however she was beaten by Kadidiatou Diani for both.

Manchester City 
On 17 June 2021, Manchester City announced that they had signed Shaw from Bordeaux on a three-year deal. Shaw scored her first hat-trick for the club in a 6–0 FA Cup win against Leicester City. She also featured as the joint topscorer of the 2021–22 FA Women's League Cup. Shaw went on to claim a winners medal as Man City triumphed, defeating Chelsea 3–1 in the League Cup final. 

She later scored four goals in Man City's 7–2 win over Brighton and Hove in the WSL.

International career 
Shaw has played internationally at the U-15, U-17, U-20 and senior levels for Jamaica, debuting for the former aged 14.

Shaw made her senior international debut on 23 August 2015,scoring twice in a 6–0 victory over the Dominican Republic in an Olympic qualifying game. In 2019, Shaw was part of the Jamaica team that qualified for the 2019 FIFA Women's World Cup. In doing so, they became the first Caribbean nation to ever qualify for a Women's World Cup.

Career statistics

Club

International 

Scores and results list Jamaica's goal tally first, score column indicates score after each Shaw goal.

Honours 
Manchester City
FA Women's League Cup: 2021–22
Women's FA Cup runners-up: 2021–22

Jamaica

CONCACAF Women's Championship third place: 2018, 2022

Individual
 Trophées FFF D1 Féminine – Team of the Year: 2020–2021
 Division 1 Féminine top scorer: 2020–2021
 Division 1 Féminine Player of the Month: October 2020, January 2021
 CONCACAF W Championship Best XI: 2022
 CONCACAF Women's Best XI: 2018
 CONCACAF Player of the Year runner-up: 2018

 FA Women's Super League Player of the Month: October 2022

 PFA WSL Fans' Player of the Month: January 2022

Orders
   rank of Commander (CD): Order of Distinction: 2020

Awards and recognition 
In 2018, Shaw was named Guardian Footballer of the Year, an award given to a footballer "who has done something truly remarkable, whether by overcoming adversity, helping others or setting a sporting example by acting with exceptional honesty."

References

External links

 Player profile at 2019 FIFA Women's World Cup
 University of Tennessee player profile

1997 births
Living people
People from Spanish Town
Jamaican women's footballers
Women's association football forwards
Tennessee Volunteers women's soccer players
FC Girondins de Bordeaux (women) players
Manchester City W.F.C. players
Division 1 Féminine players
Jamaica women's international footballers
2019 FIFA Women's World Cup players
Jamaican expatriate women's footballers
Jamaican expatriate sportspeople in the United States
Jamaican expatriate sportspeople in France
Expatriate women's soccer players in the United States
Expatriate women's footballers in France